Johnathan Mark Holifield (born July 14, 1964) was an American football running back for the Cincinnati Bengals. He played college football for the West Virginia Mountaineers.

Football career

High school
Holifield played high school football at Romulus High School in Romulus, Michigan.

College
Holifield arrived at West Virginia in 1983. During his first two seasons as a Mountaineer, 1983 and 1984, Holifield accumulated 388 yards and 5 touchdowns.

Holifield earned the starting running back job in 1984, as a junior. He rushed for 595 yards and 6 touchdowns, along with a receiving score, that season. In 1986, Holifield was elected team captain and totaled his best season statistically. He rushed for 645 yards and 3 touchdowns his final season as a Mountaineer.

Professional
Holifield was a member of the AFC Champion Cincinnati Bengals in 1988 and played 3 games for the Cincinnati Bengals in the 1989 season. He was released in 1990.

After football
Having received a bachelor's degree in political science in 1987, Holifield earned a law degree from the University of Cincinnati College of Law in 1996. He practiced law for five years, as a prosecutor in Cincinnati and in private practice by 1999.  Afterwards, Holifield became involved in economic development.

In 2006, Holifield became CEO of the Olmsted Parks Conservancy in Buffalo, New York. In 2007, Holifield was picked to lead the Urban League of Greater Cleveland.

On September 18, 2017, Holifield was named executive director of the White House initiative on historically black colleges and universities.

References

External links
Professional stats

1964 births
Living people
People from Wayne, Michigan
Players of American football from Michigan
American football running backs
West Virginia Mountaineers football players
Cincinnati Bengals players
University of Cincinnati College of Law alumni
Trump administration personnel
Romulus Senior High School alumni